Malima may refer to:

People:
 Adam Malima
 Asanterabi Malima
 Kighoma Malima
 Philemon Malima
Places:
 Malima (Fiji)
 Malima, Kenya